Georgios Vafopoulos (1903–1996) was a Greek poet, author, teacher and journalist of the 20th century.

Biography

Early years 
Vafopoulos was born on September 3, 1903 in Gevgelija, then Ottoman Empire (now North Macedonia). After the Second Balkan War, he settled in Edessa, in Fano of Kilkis, in Goumenissa and finally in Thessaloniki. In 1923 he moved to Athens, where he was enrolled in the Mathematic School of the University of Athens, but his studies got cancelled at the beginning of 1924 as he suffered from Tuberculosis. Then, he returned to Thessaloniki, and together with Kostas Kokkinos, they ran the management of the magazine "Makedonika Grammata" (Μακεδονικά Γράμματα).  From then, he started collaborating with magazines and newspapers, in which his poems, writings and articles were published. He was also the first and most notable donator of the up-coming Municipal Library of Thessaloniki.

Later years 
He served as the library manager from its foundation in 1939 until 1963, with some compulsory pauses, most notably during the German occupation of Greece. He was also a member of the editorial team of the literatural magazine "Makedonikes Imeres" (Μακεδονικές Ημέρες). He was the Secretary General of the First State Theater of Thessaloniki (1944) and a member of the Board of Directors of the State Theater of Northern Greece (1964-1967). He was also a teacher of the Aristotle University of Thessaloniki in 1990s. He received many literary prizes, from the Academy of Athens, from the municipality of Thessaloniki, but as well as from several literature societies and organizations.

Personal life and travels 
In 1924 he met with Thessalonian poetess and playwright Anthoula Stathopoulou, whom he married in 1931. In the same year he traveled to Mount Athos. In 1935, his wife died of tuberculosis. In 1938 he traveled to Italy, France and Switzerland. In the same year he met Anastasia Gerakopoulou, whom he married in 1946. In 1951 he traveled to England, where he visited the British Library. In 1955 he travelled to his hometown, Gevgelija, then under Yugoslavia, where he visited his grandfather's grave. From then until 1974 he traveled to many countries, United States, Austria, Romania, Belgium, Germany, the Netherlands, Italy, Spain and finally Cyprus. That same year he suffered a severe heart attack.

He died on September 15,  1996, after a two-month hospitalization in a clinic of Thessaloniki, at the age of 93.

Works 
Some of his works are the following:

Τα ρόδα της Μυρτάλης, 1931
Εσθήρ. Έμμετρη βιβλική τραγωδία, 1934
Η Μεγάλη Νύχτα και το Παράθυρο, 1959
Eπιθανάτια και Σάτιρες, 1966
Tα Eπιγενόμενα, 1966
Σελίδες αυτοβιογραφίας, 1970-1975 (4 volumes)

References

Citations

Sources 
 Λυγίζος Μήτσος, «Βαφόπουλος Γεώργιος»
 Παπαθανασόπουλος Θανάσης, «Βίος και έργα του Γ.Θ.Βαφόπουλου», Nea Estia 143, 1η-15/4/1998, ΟΒ', no. 1698-1699, p. 446-456
 Αρχείο Ελλήνων Λογοτεχνών, Ε.ΚΕ.ΒΙ.
 Παγκόσμιο Βιογραφικό Λεξικό 2, Athens, Ekdotike Athenon, 1984

1903 births
1996 deaths
Greek Macedonians
People from Gevgelija
Modern Greek poets
Greek journalists
National and Kapodistrian University of Athens alumni
Aristotle University of Thessaloniki alumni
Academic staff of the Aristotle University of Thessaloniki
20th-century journalists
Emigrants from the Ottoman Empire to Greece